Reginald C. Lewis (November 21, 1965 – July 27, 1993) was an American professional basketball player for the National Basketball Association's Boston Celtics from 1987 to 1993. At the age of 27, Lewis died while still a member of the Celtics, and his number was posthumously retired by the team.

Early life
Born in Baltimore, Maryland, Lewis attended high school at Dunbar High School, where he played basketball alongside future NBA players Muggsy Bogues and David Wingate. The 1981–82 Dunbar Poets finished the season at 29–0 during Lewis' junior season and finished 31–0 during his senior season, and were ranked first in the nation by USA Today.

College career
Lewis attended Northeastern University in Boston. Over his four years at Northeastern, Lewis scored 2,708 points, still the all-time record at the university. His Northeastern teams won the ECAC North all four seasons and played in the NCAA men's basketball tournament every year. The 1983–84 Huskies advanced to the second round of the NCAA tournament, falling one point shy of the Sweet 16 when Rolando Lamb scored at the buzzer to lift VCU over the Huskies.

His uniform number was retired and hangs in tribute in Matthews Arena (the home of Northeastern University's men's basketball team and the Celtics' original home arena in 1946). As a Celtic, he and his family lived in Dedham, Massachusetts. He was a second cousin of PJ Dozier, who wore the jersey number 35 as a member of the Oklahoma City Thunder in honor of Lewis.

Professional career

Boston Celtics (1987–1993)
Lewis was drafted in the first round, 22nd overall, by the Boston Celtics in the 1987 NBA draft. The Celtics were looking to add some youth to the team, especially for the aging "Big 3" of Larry Bird, Kevin McHale, and Robert Parish. This need became more urgent after Len Bias, the 2nd overall pick in the 1986 NBA draft, died of a cocaine overdose.

As a rookie, Lewis played sporadically, averaging 8.3 minutes per game under coach K. C. Jones. By his second season, thanks in part to a new coach (and an injury to Bird), Lewis averaged over 30 minutes and scored 18.5 points per game. Lewis was selected to play in his first and only NBA All-Star Game held in Orlando, Florida in 1992. He played 15 minutes, scoring 7 points and grabbing 4 rebounds.

Lewis averaged 20.8 points in each of his last two seasons with the Celtics, and finished with a career average of 17.6 points per contest.

His no. 35 jersey was retired by the Celtics, making him one of only two Celtics to have a retired number without winning a championship with the team, the other player being Ed Macauley.

On April 29, 1993, in Game 1 of the Celtics' playoff series against the Charlotte Hornets, Lewis suddenly collapsed on the court and remained on the ground for several seconds. After he finally got up, he looked perplexed and dazed as he headed to the Celtics bench. Lewis returned briefly to the game but was eventually pulled due to dizziness and shortness of breath. He left the game having scored 17 points in 13 minutes of action in what turned out to be his final NBA game.

The following day, Lewis checked into New England Baptist Hospital, where he underwent a series of tests by more than a dozen heart specialists, who the Celtics called their "dream team" of doctors. Lewis was diagnosed with "focal cardiomyopathy", a disease of the heart muscle that can cause irregular heartbeat and heart failure. Lewis was told his condition was most likely career-ending. However, he later sought a second opinion from Dr. Gilbert Mudge at Brigham and Women's Hospital, who diagnosed Lewis with neurocardiogenic syncope, a less serious non-fatal condition instead. As a result, Lewis began working out in preparation for returning for the 1994 season. Mudge was later cleared of any wrongdoing, and he insisted he had never authorized Lewis to resume workouts.

Death
On July 27, 1993, during off-season practice at Brandeis University in Waltham, Massachusetts, Lewis suffered sudden cardiac death on the basketball court at the age of 27 years old. Two Brandeis University police officers found Lewis and attempted to revive him using mouth-to-mouth resuscitation, but they were unsuccessful. One of the officers was James Crowley.

Lewis is buried in an unmarked grave in Forest Hills Cemetery in Jamaica Plain, Massachusetts.

His death was attributed to hypertrophic cardiomyopathy, a structural heart defect that is the most common cause of death in young athletes.

Aftermath
Following Lewis' death, questions were raised about whether he had used cocaine, and whether cocaine use had contributed to his death. The Wall Street Journal reported that physicians "suspected that cocaine killed Boston Celtics star Reggie Lewis...but they were thwarted by actions by his family and a 'dismissive' policy toward drugs by the NBA." The Journal added the following:

Whether Mr. Lewis died from a heart damaged by cocaine -- as many doctors suspected then and now -- cannot be definitively shown. What is evident: The official cause of death, a heart damaged by a common-cold virus, is a medically nonsensical finding by a coroner who was under intense pressure from the Lewis family to exclude any implication of drug use.

The Boston Celtics responded by expressing sadness about the "vicious attack on Reggie Lewis and his family" and threatening "to file a $100 million lawsuit against the reporter, The Wall Street Journal and its parent company, Dow Jones and Co. Inc." Dr. Gilbert Mudge, a doctor who treated Lewis, was sued for malpractice in connection with Lewis' death; in written responses to questions from the attorneys for Donna Harris-Lewis, Mudge said that "16 days before Lewis collapsed from a heart attack in 1993, he acknowledged having used cocaine, but said he had stopped." On the other hand, the doctor who performed the autopsy on Lewis testified that the scarring on his heart was inconsistent with cocaine use, and other doctors reached the same conclusion though they "stopped short of saying he never used drugs." Also, Lewis's heart tissue tested positive for adenovirus during his autopsy.

After Lewis' death, the Reggie Lewis Track and Athletic Center was opened in Roxbury, Boston. The center was funded partially by Lewis and has hosted major indoor track and field competitions, the Boston Indoor Games, home basketball games for Roxbury Community College, and Northeastern University track and field events.

On March 22, 1995, the Boston Celtics retired Lewis' jersey. Lewis had worn the number 35 for his entire career. During the ceremony, former teammate Dee Brown made a speech while two other former teammates, Sherman Douglas and Xavier McDaniel, held up Lewis' framed jersey.

Lewis' contract remained on the Celtics' salary cap for two full seasons after his death because at the time the NBA did not have a provision to void contracts if an active player died; NBA Commissioner David Stern suggested that the remaining NBA teams should approve an exemption for Lewis' contract, but the teams refused to do so. The rules have since been changed so that a similar case would result in a deceased player's contract being paid by league insurance.

NBA career statistics

Regular season

|-
| style="text-align:left;"|
| style="text-align:left;"|Boston
| 49 || 0 || 8.3 || .466 || .000 || .702 || 1.3 || .5 || .3 || .3 || 4.5
|-
| style="text-align:left;"|
| style="text-align:left;"|Boston
| 81 || 57 || 32.8 || .486 || .136 || .787 || 4.7 || 2.7 || 1.5 || .9 || 18.5
|-
| style="text-align:left;"|
| style="text-align:left;"|Boston
| 79 || 54 || 31.9 || .496 || .267 || .808 || 4.4 || 2.8 || 1.1 || .8 || 17.0
|-
| style="text-align:left;"|
| style="text-align:left;"|Boston
| 79 || 79 || 36.4 || .491 || .077 || .826 || 5.2 || 2.5 || 1.2 || 1.1 || 18.7
|-
| style="text-align:left;"|
| style="text-align:left;"|Boston
| 82 || 82 || 37.4 || .503 || .238 || .851 || 4.8 || 2.3 || 1.5 || 1.3 || 20.8
|-
| style="text-align:left;"|
| style="text-align:left;"|Boston
| 80 || 80 || 39.3 || .470 || .233 || .867 || 4.3 || 3.7 || 1.5 || 1.0 || 20.8
|- class="sortbottom"
| style="text-align:center;" colspan="2"|Career
| 450 || 352 || 32.6 || .488 || .200 || .824 || 4.3 || 2.6 || 1.3 || .9 || 17.6
|- class="sortbottom"
| style="text-align:center;" colspan="2"|All-Star
| 1 || 0 || 15.0 || .429 || – || .500 || 4.0 || 2.0 || – || 1.0 || 7.0

Playoffs

|-
| style="text-align:left;"|1988
| style="text-align:left;"|Boston
| 12 || 0 || 5.8 || .382 || .000 || .600 || 1.3 || .3 || .3 || .2 || 2.4
|-
| style="text-align:left;"|1989
| style="text-align:left;"|Boston
| 3 || 3 || 41.7 || .473 || .000 || .692 || 7.0 || 3.7 || 1.7 || .0 || 20.3
|-
| style="text-align:left;"|1990
| style="text-align:left;"|Boston
| 5 || 5 || 40.0 || .597 || .000 || .771 || 5.0 || 4.4 || 1.4 || .4 || 20.2
|-
| style="text-align:left;"|1991
| style="text-align:left;"|Boston
| 11 || 11 || 42.0 || .487 || .000 || .824 || 6.2 || 2.9 || 1.1 || .5 || 22.4
|-
| style="text-align:left;"|1992
| style="text-align:left;"|Boston
| 10 || 10 || 40.8 || .528 || .333 || .762 || 4.3 || 3.9 || 2.4 || .8 || 28.0
|-
| style="text-align:left;"|1993
| style="text-align:left;"|Boston
| 1 || 1 || 13.0 || .636 || .000 || .750 || 2.0 || 1.0 || .0 || 1.0 || 17.0
|- class="sortbottom"
| style="text-align:center;" colspan="2"|Career
| 42 || 30 || 30.4 || .510 || .133 || .777 || 4.2 || 2.6 || 1.2 || .5 || 17.5

See also
 List of basketball players who died during their careers

References

External links

 The Journal's Reggie Lewis Bombshell
 Remembering Reggie Lewis - at nba.com
 Remembering Reggie Lewis

1965 births
1993 deaths
African-American basketball players
American men's basketball players
Basketball players from Baltimore
Boston Celtics draft picks
Boston Celtics players
National Basketball Association All-Stars
National Basketball Association players with retired numbers
Northeastern Huskies men's basketball players
Small forwards
Sports deaths in Massachusetts
Sportspeople from Dedham, Massachusetts
20th-century African-American sportspeople
Deaths from cardiomyopathy